Saksiri Meesomsueb (born 23 August 1957 in Nakhon Sawan) is a Thai poet and writer. He is also known by the pen name Kittisak.

Meesomsueb won the 1992 S.E.A. Write Award for his collection of poems, That Hand is White.  In 2005, he was given the Silpathorn Award for Literature.

References

External links
 

Saksiri Meesomsueb
1957 births
Living people
S.E.A. Write Award winners
Saksiri Meesomsueb
Saksiri Meesomsueb
20th-century poets
21st-century poets
Saksiri Meesomsueb
Saksiri Meesomsueb